Rouge Dragon Pursuivant of Arms in Ordinary is a junior officer of arms of the College of Arms, named after the red dragon of Wales.

The current Rouge Dragon Pursuivant is Adam Tuck, who was appointed on 12 June 2019. The office had been vacant since April 2010 when the previous holder, Clive Cheesman was appointed to the office of Richmond Herald of Arms in Ordinary.

Holders of the office

See also
 Heraldry
 Officer of Arms
 The College of Arms

References
Citations

Bibliography
 The College of Arms, Queen Victoria Street : being the sixteenth and final monograph of the London Survey Committee, Walter H. Godfrey, assisted by Sir Anthony Wagner, with a complete list of the officers of arms, prepared by H. Stanford London, (London, 1963)
 A History of the College of Arms &c, Mark Noble, (London, 1804)

External links
The College of Arms
CUHGS Officer of Arms Index

Offices of the College of Arms